Tajuria mizunumai is a butterfly of the family Lycaenidae. It is found only on Mindanao in the Philippines. It was originally listed as a subspecies of Tajuria dominus, but was changed species status as Tajuria mizunumai by Colin G. Treadaway in 1995 and by H. Hayashiin 2017.

References
 Hayashi, Hisakazu, 1978: New Subspecies of Narathura bazalus and Tajuria dominus from Mindanao. Tyô to Ga. 29(2): 114-116.
 Treadaway, Colin G., 1995: Checklist of the butterflies of the Philippine Islands (Lepidoptera: Rhopalocera) Nachrichten des Entomologischen Vereins Apollo, Suppl. 14: 7-118.
 Hayashi, Hisakazu, 2017: Nomenclatural status of Tajuria mizunumai (Lepidoptera, Lycaenidae) from Mindanao Island in the Philippines. Butterflies. 76: 22-25.

Lepidoptera of the Philippines
Butterflies described in 1978
Tajuria